Macauley King (born 4 October 1995) is an English footballer who plays as a defender for Colorado Springs Switchbacks in the USL Championship. While in college, he played in the Premier Development League with Mississippi Brilla, Charlotte Eagles, and Seattle Sounders FC U-23. On 7 January 2022, King moved to Colorado Springs Switchbacks.

References

External links
Profile at YHC Athletics

1995 births
Living people
English footballers
Leicester City F.C. players
Barwell F.C. players
Heather St John's F.C. players
Mississippi Brilla players
Charlotte Eagles players
Seattle Sounders FC U-23 players
Indy Eleven players
El Paso Locomotive FC players
Colorado Springs Switchbacks FC players
USL League Two players
USL Championship players
Association football defenders
English expatriate footballers
Expatriate soccer players in the United States
English expatriate sportspeople in the United States